Military provinces of Thailand (incorrectly referred to as the "military circles") are subdivisions of the Royal Thai Army. Each military province governs and supports all military units and personnel in its area. Several military provinces are grouped into a military region. A military province can cover one or more civil provinces.

Currently there are 35 military provinces, grouped into 4 military regions in Thailand.

Map of military provinces of Thailand 
Military provinces in Thailand, according to the 2015 ministerial regulation, can be mapped as follows. Some military provinces cover more than one civil provinces, while many cover only one civil provinces (particularly northern provinces). Each military province is numbered. The first digit denotes the military region in which the military province is located. The second digit is a sequential number 1 to 9 (or 10). As a result, there are no military province 10, 20, 30 and 40.

History

1948-1965 
From 1897 to 1933, Siam (now Thailand) was divided into 21 civil provinces (monthons). Each province covers several civil counties (changwats), headed by counts (or governors). Each county contains districts (amphurs), which in turns, covers subdistricts (tambons). The Government Organisation of Siam Act, 1933 eliminated the existence of monthons. As a result, changwats have been referred to as provinces since then.

However, the Royal Thai Army are differently organised. Thailand was divided into military provinces, each of which encompassed many military counties and units, just like military regions today. Each military province had several roles, including the recruitment of new soldiers, military justice, national protection and peacekeeping. Military province encompassed many counties (or civil provinces). In 1948, there were five military provinces. Each province contains following counties:
 Military Province 1 (central): Phra Nakhon, Thon Buri, Chai Nat, Nakhon Pathom, Nonthaburi, Pathum Thani, Phra Nakhon Si Ayutthaya, Lopburi, Sing Buri, Saraburi, Suphan Buri, Ang Thong;
 Military Province 2 (eastern): Chachoengsao, Nakhon Nayok, Prachin Buri;
 Military Province 3 (northeastern): Khon Kaen, Chaiyaphum, Nakhon Phanom, Nakhon Ratchasima, Nong Khai, Buriram, Maha Sarakham, Roi Et, Loei, Sisaket, Sakon Nakhon, Surin, Udon Thani, Ubon Ratchathani;
 Military Province 4 (northern): Kamphaeng Phet, Chiang Mai, Chiang Rai, Tak, Nakhon Sawan, Nan, Phitsanulok, Phetchabun, Phrae, Mae Hong Son, Lampang, Lamphun, Sukhothai, Uttaradit, Uthai Thani;
 Military Province 5 (southern): Krabi, Kanchanaburi, Chumphon, Trang, Nakhon Si Thammarat, Narathiwat, Prachuap Khiri Khan, Pattani, Phangnga, Phatthalung, Phetchaburi, Phuket, Yala, Ranong, Ratchaburi, Satun, Songkhla, Surat Thani

1965-1990
It was realised in 1966 that the organisation of the army was too centralised, bulky and impractical. The government proposed that the country should be divided into three military regions. Each region covered several military provinces, which, in turns, encompassed many military counties.

 Military Region 1
 1st Military Province: 
 Bangkok Military County: Phra Nakhon, Thon Buri, Nakhon Pathom, Nonthaburi, Pathum Thani, Samut Prakan, Samut Sakhon and Suphan Buri
 Phetchaburi Military County: Phetchaburi and Prachuap Khiri Khan
 Ratchaburi Military County: Ratchaburi, Kanchanaburi and Samut Songkhram
 Saraburi Military County: Saraburi and Phra Nakhon Si Ayutthaya
 2nd Military Province: 
 Chachoengsao Military County: Chachoengsao, Chanthaburi, Chonburi, Trat and Rayong
 Prachin Buri Military County: Prachin Buri and Nakhon Nayok
 Lopburi Military County: Lopburi, Chai Nat, Sing Buri and Ang Thong
 Military Region 2
 3rd Military Province: 
 Khon Kaen Military County: Khon Kaen, Maha Sarakham and Loei
 Nakhon Ratchasima Military County: Nakhon Ratchasima and Chaiyaphum
 Surin Military County: Surin and Buriram
 Udon Military County: Udon Thani, Nong Khai, Nakhon Phanom and Sakon Nakhon
 6th Military Province:
 Roi Et Military County: Roi Et and Kalasin
 Ubon Military County: Ubon Ratchathani and Sisaket
 Military Region 3
 4th Military Province:
 Nakhon Sawan Military County: Nakhon Sawan, Kamphaeng Phet and Uthai Thani
 Phitsanulok Military County: Phitsanulok, Tak, Phichit, Phetchabun and Sukhothai
 Uttaradit Military County: Uttaradit, Nan and Phrae
 7th Military Province:
 Chiang Rai Military County: Chiang Rai
 Chiang Mai Military County: Chiang Mai, Mae Hong Son and Lamphun
 Lampang Military County: Lampang
 5th Military Province (later 4th Military Region):
 Chumphon Military County: Chumphon, Ranong, Surat Thani
 Nakhon Si Thammarat Military County: Nakhon Si Thammarat, Krabi, Trang, Phangnga, Phatthalung and Phuket
 Songkhla Military County: Songkhla, Narathiwat, Pattani, Yala and Satun

1990-2014
The Royal Thai Army underwent several reorganisations. In 1981, Chon Buri (region 1) and Chiang Mai (region 3) Military Counties was established. Chon Buri Military County covered Chon Buri, Trat and Rayong, while Chiang Mai Military County covered Chiang Mai, Mae Hong Son and Lamphun. Frustrated by the complexities, the government completely rearranged its army into four Military Regions, each region has military provinces as follows
 Military Region 1
 Military Province 11
 Bangkok Military County: Bangkok, Nakhon Pathom, Pathum Thani, Samut Prakarn and Samut Sakhon
 Kanchanaburi Military County: Kanchanaburi and Suphan Buri
 Military Province 12
 Prachin Buri Military County: Prachin Buri and Nakhon Nayok
 Chachoengsao Military County: Chachoengsao
 Sa Kaeo Military County: Sa Kaeo (formerly part of Prachin Buri)
 Military Province 13
 Lopburi Military County: Lopburi, Chai Nat, Sing Buri and Ang Thong
 Saraburi Military County: Saraburi and Phra Nakhon Si Ayutthaya
 Military Province 14
 Chon Buri Military County: Chonburi, Chanthaburi, Trat and Rayong
 Military Province 15
 Phetchaburi Military County (formerly part of Military Province 11): Phetchaburi and Prachuap Khiri Khan
 Ratchaburi Military County (formerly part of Military Province 11): Ratchaburi and Samut Songkhram
 Military Region 2
 Military Province 21
 Nakhon Ratchasima Military County: Nakhon Ratchasima and Chaiyaphum
 Buriram Military County: Buriram
 Surin Military County: Surin
 Military Province 22
 Ubon Military County: Ubon Ratchathani, Mukdahan, Sisaket and Amnat Charoen
 Roi Et Military County: Roi Et and Yasothon
 Military Province 23
 Khon Kaen Military County: Khon Kaen, Kalasin and Maha Sarakham
 Loei Military County: Loei
 Military Province 24
 Udon Military County: Udon, Nong Khai and Nong Bua Lamphu
 Nakhon Phanom Military County: Nakhon Phanom
 Sakon Nakhon Military County: Sakon Nakhon
 Military Region 3
 Military Province 31
 Nakhon Sawan Military County: Nakhon Sawan, Kamphaeng Phet and Uthai Thani
 Tak Military County: Tak
 Phetchabun Military County: Phetchabun and Phichit
 Phitsanulok Military County: Phitsanulok and Sukhothai
 Military Province 32
 Lampang Military County: Lampang
 Phayao Military County: Phayao
 Nan Military County: Nan
 Uttaradit Military County: Uttaradit and Phrae
 Military Province 33
 Chiang Mai Military County: Chiang Mai, Mae Hong Son and Lamphun
 Chiang Rai Military County: Chiang Rai
 Military Region 4
 Military Province 41
 Nakhon Si Thammarat Military County: Nakhon Si Thammarat (except for Thung Song District), Krabi, Phangnga and Phuket
 Chumphon Military County: Chumphon and Ranong
 Thung Song Military County: Nakhon Si Thammarat (only Thung Song District) and Trang
 Surat Thani Military County: Surat Thani
 Military Province 42
 Songkhla Military County: Songkhla, Phatthalung and Satun
 Pattani Military County: Pattani, Narathiwat and Yala

2015-present
In 2015, a military government led by Prayut Chan-o-cha dissolved all military counties. This resulted in the establishment of many military provinces, covering one or few civil provinces (or counties) to shorten the chain of command. Each military province is allocated its two- or three-digit code, beginning with military region code, followed by the number 1 to 10. It can be observed that the Military Region 2 was completely reorganised into several military provinces. Military Region 3 formerly had 3 military provinces but now have 10 military provinces, most of which cover only one civil province. 
 Military Region 1 (Central)
 Military Province 11 (Bangkok Military Province): Bangkok, Nakhon Pathom, Nonthaburi, Pathum Thani and Samut Prakarn
 Military Province 12 (Prachin Buri Military Province): Prachin Buri, Nakhon Nayok and Chachoengsao
 Military Province 13 (Lopburi Military Province): Lopburi, Chai Nat, Sing Buri and Ang Thong
 Military Province 14 (Chon Buri Military Province): Chon Buri and Rayong
 Military Province 15 (Phetchaburi Military Province): Phetchaburi and Prachuap Khiri Khan
 Military Province 16 (Ratchaburi Military Province): Ratchaburi, Samut Songkhram and Samut Sakhon
 Military Province 17 (Kanchanaburi Military Province): Kanchanaburi and Suphan Buri
 Military Province 18 (Saraburi Military Province): Saraburi and Phra Nakhon Si Ayutthaya
 Military Province 19 (Sa Kaeo Military Province): Sa Kaeo, Chanthaburi and Trat
 Military Region 2 (Northeastern)
 Military Province 21 (Nakhon Ratchasima Military Province): Nakhon Ratchasima and Chaiyaphum
 Military Province 22 (Ubon Military Province): Ubon Ratchathani and Amnat Charoen
 Military Province 23 (Khon Kaen Military Province): Khon Kaen and Kalasin
 Military Province 24 (Udon Military Province): Udon Thani and Nong Khai
 Military Province 25 (Surin Military Province): Surin and Sisaket
 Military Province 26 (Buriram Military Province): Buriram and Maha Sarakham
 Military Province 27 (Roi Et Military Province): Roi Et and Yasothon
 Military Province 28 (Loei Military Province): Loei and Nong Bua Lamphu
 Military Province 29 (Sakon Nakhon Military Province): Sakon Nakhon and Bueng Kan
 Military Province 210 (Nakhon Phanom Military Province): Nakhon Phanom and Mukdahan
 Military Region 3 (Northern)
 Military Province 31 (Nakhon Sawan Military Province): Nakhon Sawan, Kamphaeng Phet and Uthai Thani
 Military Province 32 (Lampang Military Province): Lampang
 Military Province 33 (Chiang Mai Military Province): Chiang Mai, Mae Hong Son and Lamphun
 Military Province 34 (Phayao Military Province): Phayao
 Military Province 35 (Uttaradit Military Province): Uttaradit and Phrae
 Military Province 36 (Phetchabun Military Province): Phetchabun and Phichit
 Military Province 37 (Chiang Rai Military Province): Chiang Rai
 Military Province 38 (Nan Military Province): Nan
 Military Province 39 (Phitsanulok Military Province): Phitsanulok and Sukhothai
 Military Province 310 (Tak Military Province): Tak
 Military Region 4 (Southern)
 Military Province 41 (Nakhon Si Thammarat Military Province): Nakhon Si Thammarat (except for Thung Song District) and Phuket
 Military Province 42 (Songkhla Military Province): Songkhla, Phatthalung and Satun
 Military Province 43 (Thung Song Military Province): Nakhon Si Thammarat (only Thung Song District), Krabi and Trang
 Military Province 44 (Chumphon Military Province): Chumphon and Ranong
 Military Province 45 (Surat Thani Military Province): Surat Thani and Phangnga
 Military Province 46 (Pattani Military Province): Pattani, Narathiwat and Yala

Roles
In accordance with the ministerial regulations on the roles and coverage of military provinces, military provinces
 Govern local military forces, according to instructions and regulations by the Ministry of Defence;
 Maintain peace in its area; supervises military courts, cases, witness protection and military prisons;
 Recruit new members of the forces; oversees conscription and military summoning;
 Support military units in its area;
 Protect the internal security and national security according to the strategic plan;
 Support the government in supporting Thai citizens;
 Work closely with the Internal Security Operations Command local centres.

Naval region
The Royal Thai Navy has a similar subdivision system. There are three naval regions in Thailand. Each region covers different sections of coastline.
 Naval Region 1: Upper portion of the Gulf of Thailand, from Chumphon to Trat. Its headquarters are in Sattahip, Chon Buri. 
 Naval Region 2: Lower portion of the Gulf of Thailand, from Surat Thani to Narathiwat. Its headquarters are in Songkhla.
 Naval Region 3: Andaman Sea, from Ranong to Satun. Its headquarters are in Phuket.

Notes

References

See also 
 Provinces of Thailand
 Monthon
 Royal Thai Army
 Military district

Military of Thailand
Royal Thai Army